In association football, the situation of players being capped for two senior national teams is fairly rare. The list of these players includes only those who have been capped by two countries for senior matches. It does not include the far wider scope of those who have played at youth level (U23 or below) for one country then at senior level for another – something which became possible following a 2004 rule change, then more common when an age limit was removed in 2009 – or those who were eligible for more than one country, but only played for one.

Non-inclusion categories
Players whose original country ceased to exist and who then played for a successor state, prominent examples being those who had played for the Soviet Union (and/or Commonwealth of Independent States), East Germany, Yugoslavia or Czechoslovakia in the early 1990s, or who played for one national team prior to a region becoming independent and then also played for that new state, for example the secession of South Sudan from Sudan. This contrasts to the situation with Kosovo in the 2010s when it became an official FIFA team: several players who had moved to other parts of Europe in childhood switched from those national teams (or Albania, which granted passports to those displaced ethnic Albanian persons) to play for Kosovo, but this change was not automatic based on their birthplace, and as such those who made that choice are listed below (see Football in Kosovo).
Players who were capped for one or more countries in a youth match and then a different country in senior matches.
Players who appeared for non-affiliated regional teams such as Catalonia.
Players who featured for more than one of the national teams representing Ireland in the second quarter of the 20th century, which are listed separately.

Eligibility

In the 20th century, FIFA allowed a player to represent any national team, as long as the player held citizenship of that country. In 2004, in reaction to the growing trend towards naturalisation of foreign players in some countries, FIFA implemented a significant new ruling that requires a player to demonstrate a "clear connection" to any country they wish to represent. Under the rules, in order for a player to switch nationalities, a player must not have played in a competitive fixture (that is, can only have played in friendlies for the first country), and FIFA approval is necessary.

In 2021, FIFA published a new set of rules, updating the rules for changes of nationalities. While previously, players were able to switch only if they had appeared in friendly fixture(s) for the first nation, with the growing trend of competitive fixtures such as the Nations League replacing many friendly fixtures, the change was made. Under the new regulations, players can switch national teams, even if they have played in an official competition for the first nation (unless the match was in the tournament phases of the World Cup or a continental competition), provided they played in three or fewer competitive matches and the appearance(s) occurred before the player turned 21. These changes were intended to prevent the 'stockpiling' of players. If a player is 21 or over, the previous rule remains in place: to be eligible for a switch, any appearance(s) must have been in non-competitive fixtures.

List of players

2021–present
Beginning in 2021, FIFA adjusted their rules to allow for players to be eligible to represent a new national team if they had played in no more than three competitive fixtures (including none in the tournament phases of the FIFA World Cup and continental competitions) prior to the age of 21 or if they had only played in non-competitive (friendly) matches at any age. Three years must have passed since the date of the previous competitive fixture in order for the player to be eligible to switch; there is no time requirement for friendly matches.

2004–2020
Between 2004 and 2020, FIFA permitted players to play for a new association if the player had only played in non-competitive fixtures (friendlies) for the original nation or if the new association was a newly-formed nation.

Prior to 2004
Prior to 2004, players could play for a new nation provided they were citizens of that country.

Notes

See also
 Cap-tied
 FIFA eligibility rules

References

External links
 RSSSF – Players Appearing for Two or More Countries

Nationality transfers
 
 
Association football player non-biographical articles